Mitrella noel is a species of sea snail in the family Columbellidae, the dove snails.

Distribution
The species is endemic to the island of São Tomé.

References

Rolán E. & Gori S. (2009). Two new species of the genera Jujubinus and Mitrella (Mollusca, Prosobranchia) from Sao Tomé Island. Gloria Maris 48(1): 10–16.

noel
Endemic fauna of São Tomé Island
Gastropods described in 2009